Plato (also Plato Comicus; Ancient Greek: Πλάτων Κωμικός) was an Athenian comic poet and contemporary of Aristophanes.  None of his plays survive intact, but the titles of thirty of them are known, including a Hyperbolus (c. 420–416 BC), Victories (after 421), Cleophon (in 405), and Phaon (probably in 391).  The titles suggest that his themes were often political.  In 410 BC, one of his plays took first prize at the City Dionysia.

Phaon included a scene (quoted in the Deipnosophistae of Athenaeus) in which a character sits down to study a poem about gastronomy (in fact mostly about aphrodisiacs) and reads some of it aloud: "In ashes first your onions roast, Till they are brown as toast, Then with sauce and gravy cover; Eat them, you'll be strong all over." The poem is in hexameters, and therefore sounds like a lampoon of the work of Archestratus, although the speaker calls it "a book by Philoxenus", meaning either the poet Philoxenus of Cythera, the glutton Philoxenus of Leucas, or both indiscriminately.

Surviving titles and fragments
Of Plato's plays only the following thirty titles have come down to us, along with 292 associated fragments.

Adonis
The Alliance
Ambassadors
Amphiareos
Ants
Cleophon
Daidalus
Europe
Festivals
Greece, or the Islands
Griffins
Hyperbolus
Io
Laius
Laconians, or Poets
Little Child
The Long Night
Meneleos
Peisander
Perialges
Phaon
Pieces of Furniture
The Poet
The Resident Aliens
The Sophists
Syrphex
Victories
The Women from the Temples
Xantriai, or Kerkopes
Zeus Being Wronged

References
The Oxford Classical Dictionary, p. 1193.
Rosen, Ralph M. (1995) Plato Comicus and the Evolution of Greek Comedy. Published in Beyond Aristophanes: Transition and Diversity in Greek Comedy (Atlanta: Scholars Press, 1995), pages 119-137.

External links

 

Ancient Greek dramatists and playwrights
Ancient Greek poets
Old Comic poets
5th-century BC Athenians
Year of birth unknown
Year of death unknown